is a Japanese animator, manga artist, and illustrator. He is often noted for his work with anime studio Sunrise. Helen McCarthy in 500 Essential Anime Movies commented that he "shot to fame" in 1985 as a character designer on the Zeta Gundam TV series.

Works

Anime television
Aura Battler Dunbine - Animation Director (episodes 23, 33, 37, 42, 45, and 47)
Heavy Metal L-Gaim - Animation Director (episodes 1, 5, 10, 15, 20, 23, 27, 30, and 37)
Super Dimension Cavalry Southern Cross - Secondary Character Designer
Mobile Suit Zeta Gundam - Animation Director (episodes 1, 6, 11, 15, 19, 23, 26, and 36)
Mobile Suit Gundam ZZ - Character Designer; Animation Director (episodes 2, 32 and 47)

Original video animation (OVA)
Digital Devil Story: Megami Tensei - Character Design 
Megazone 23 - Key Animation (Part 2), Character Designer (Part 3)
Robot Carnival - Director, Script, Character Design (Starlight Angel)
Dragon Century - Animation Director and Character Designer
Genesis Survivor Gaiarth - Screenplay, Original Concept, Character Design, Key Animation (ep. 1)
Moldiver - Director, Original Concept, Character Design, Animation Director (ep 6), Animation (OP/ED)
Yamato 2520 - Character Designer

Anime Films
Mobile Suit Gundam: Char's Counterattack - Character Design, Animation Director

References

External links
 Hiroyuki Kitazume anime works in Media Arts Database 

Sunrise (company) people
Manga artists from Tokyo
Japanese animators
Japanese animated film directors
Anime character designers
1961 births
Living people
People from Tokyo